Ewin is both a surname and a given name. Notable people with the name include:

Surname
David Floyd Ewin (1911–2003), English administrator of St Paul’s Cathedral
Donna Ewin (born 1970), English former glamour model and actress
Paula Ewin (born 1965), Australian wheelchair basketball player
Stuart Ewin, OAM (born 1967), Australian wheelchair basketball player
Wayne Ewin (born 1953), former Australian rules footballer
William Ewin (1808–1886), American artisan, lawyer, civil servant and State Senator
William Howell Ewin (1731?–1804), English usurer

Given name
Ewin L. Davis (1876–1949), American politician, member of the United States House of Representatives
Ewin Ryckaert, film editor with more than seventy film credits

See also
Glen Ewin jams and preserves, founded by George McEwin (1815–1885), gardener and orchardist in the early days of South Australia
Erin (disambiguation)
Ewing (disambiguation)
Erwin (disambiguation)
Ewan (disambiguation)
Ewen (disambiguation)
Edwin (disambiguation)
Evin (disambiguation)